Priyappetta Nattukare is a 2011 Malayalam political thriller film directed by debutant Sreejith Palery, starring Kalabhavan Mani, Bala and Lakshmi Sharma in the lead roles.

Plot
Priyappetta Nattukare is a political thriller film. Kalabhavan Mani is a communist party activist and Bala is the activist of their opposition party. The political fights between the two forms the story.

Cast
 Kalabhavan Mani as Sakhavu Dasan
 Bala as Satheesh Kumar
 Lakshmi Sharma as Priyankari (Fake)
 Mallika as Ambili
 Jagathy Sreekumar as Gandhi Kittan
 Kalabhavan Shajon as Mani
 Suraj Venjaramoodu
 Mala Aravindan as Sakhavu Pappan
 M. R. Gopakumar as Sakhavu Appu
 Aneesh Ravi as Sakhavu Chandran
 Jai Krishnan
 Ganesh Kumar as G.K
 Poojapurra Radhakrishnan
 Nandhu
 Sukumari as Vilasini
 Kanakalatha
 Roselin
 Geetha Nair

Production
Mukesh was initially cast in the role of a communist Dasan.

References

2010s Malayalam-language films
2010s political thriller films
Films about communism
Indian political thriller films